Paweł Pośpiech (1879 in Kokoszyce – 1922 in Pszczyna) was a Polish priest, activist and journalist.

1879 births
1922 deaths
Polish activists
Polish journalists
Polish deputies to the Reichstag in Berlin